São Pedro da Água Branca is the westernmost municipality in the Brazilian state of Maranhão, bordering both Pará and Tocantins states.

The city has one of the most important railway stations on the Carajás Railway line.

References 

Municipalities in Maranhão
Populated places established in 1996